First Fandom Hall of Fame is an annual award for contributions to the field of science fiction dating back more than 30 years. Contributions can be as a fan, writer, editor, artist, agent, or any combination of the five. It is awarded by First Fandom and is usually presented at the beginning of the World Science Fiction Convention's Hugo Award ceremony.

List of winners

1960s
1963
 E. E. Smith

1964
 Hugo Gernsback

1966
 David H Keller

1967
 Edmond Hamilton

1968
 Jack Williamson

1969
 Murray Leinster

1970s
1970
 Virgil Finlay

1971
 John W. Campbell Jr.

1972
 C. L. Moore

1973
 Clifford D. Simak

1974
 Forrest J Ackerman
 Sam Moskowitz

1975
 Donald A. Wollheim

1976
 Harry Bates

1977
 Frank Belknap Long

1978
 E. Hoffmann Price

1979
 Raymond Z. Gallun

1980s
1980
 George O. Smith

1981
 Stanton A. Coblentz

1982
 Bill Crawford

1983
 Manly Wade Wellman

1984
 H. L. Gold

1985
 Wilson Tucker
 Robert Bloch

1986
 Julius Schwartz
 Don Wandrei

1987
 Beatrice Mahaffey

1988
 Lloyd Eshbach
 Neil R Jones
 David Kyle
 Charles Hornig

1989
 Frederik Pohl
 Donald Grant
 L. Sprague de Camp

1990s
1990
 Edd Cartier
 Robert A. Madle
 Alex Schomburg

1991
 Robert A. W. Lowndes

1992
 Nelson S. Bond
 J. Harvey Haggard
 Art Saha
 Arthur L. Widner Jr.

1993
 Ray Beam

1994
 E. F. Bleiler
 Gerry de la Ree
 Andre Norton

1995
 C. M. Kornbluth
 Jack Speer
 Harry Warner, Jr.
 Mort Weisinger

1996
 Forrest J Ackerman
 Ray Bradbury
 Ray Harryhausen
 Frank K. Kelly
 Erle Melvin Korshak
 Julius Schwartz

1997
 Hal Clement

1998
 Jack Agnew
 John Baltadonis
 Milton A. Rothman

2000s
2000
 Theodore R. Cogswell
 Martin Greenberg
 Mark Schulzinger

2001
 Frank M. Robinson

2002
 Sir Arthur C. Clarke
 Martha Beck

2003
 Philip José Farmer
 Philip Nowlan

2004
 Brian Aldiss
 Robert Peterson
 William L. Hamling

2005
 Howard Devore

2006
 Joe L. Hensley

2007
 Algis Budrys

2008
 Mike Ashley
 Isaac Asimov (posthumous)
 Ray Harryhausen

2009
 Walt Daugherty (posthumous)
 James Gunn
 Ben Indick

2010s
2010
 Ray Cummings (posthumous)
 Terry Jeeves
 Joe Martino

2011
 Jay Kay Klein
 Oliver Saari

2012
 Ray Bradbury
 Larry Farsace
 Claude Held
 Rusty Hevelin (posthumous)
 Jack Robins

2013
 Sam Basham
 Thaddeus E. Dikty (posthumous)
 Earl Kemp
 Lester Mayer
 Raymond A. Palmer (posthumous)
 Norman F. Stanley

2015
 Julian May
 Margaret Brundage (posthumous)
 Bruce Pelz (posthumous)
 F. Orlin Tremaine (posthumous)

References

External links
First Fandom official website

Science fiction awards
Awards established in 1963
Halls of fame in New York (state)